Jeroen Speak (born June 1969) is a New Zealand-born British composer.

Biography
Jeroen Speak received undergraduate training in New Zealand. With the aid of the William Georgetti and Herbert Sutcliffe scholarships he  completed a master's degree at  Victoria University of Wellington, where he graduated in 1993. In 1994 he was the Composer in Residence at the Nelson School of Music before moving to Britain where he completed a D Phil at the University of Sussex under Michael Finnissy, he has also studied with John Young, and Jonathan Harvey.

In 2004 he was awarded a place in the 'Visiting Arts' exchange programme with Taiwan where he developed his interests in Chinese and Taiwanese music and aesthetics. In 2005 he was awarded an 'Artist Links' fellowship by the British Council to further develop these interests in Shanghai, China.

In 1992 he was the recipient of the  ACL Yoshiro Irino Memorial Prize  at the 14th Asian Composers' League Festival, in the same year he was awarded first place the Asia-Pacific Festival Competition for Young New Zealand Composers for his work Plagal Nuances. In 1998 he was awarded first place in the 19th ACL Festival young composers competition in Taiwan for his work Auxetos. The first New Zealander to have won the prize.  He received the Philip Neil Memorial Prize  from the University of Otago  the following year for his work Etudes. His work has been played by  Forum Music (Taiwan), ELISION Ensemble (Australia), Stroma (New Zealand) as well as soloists such as clarinetist Richard Haynes, and pianist Nicolas Hodges. In 2013-2014 he was Composer in Residence at the New Zealand School of Music.

Style

Speak's work can not be easily positioned in the standard European tradition, perhaps a legacy of his New Zealand roots and the influence of his interests in Chinese culture, his style is balanced between the ephemeral and the rigorous, characterised, in his own words, by “polemical internal musical debate, self contradictory behaviour, the simultaneous presentation of 'truth' with 'deceit', a continuous unification of opposites”. This dichotomy is reflected in his work 'Epeisodos', for solo E flat clarinet (1998), which, while rigorous in terms of its various systems of note and register generation, is also partly a transcription of an electroencephalograph of a patient suffering an epileptic seizure, and his piano trio 'Lingua e Realidade' (2007) which explores the Brazilian Vilem Flusser's ideas relating to the function and nature of language, and its focus on the pre-conceptual state just prior to symbolisation.

Works

 Arabesques (2001), violin and piano
 Architecture of Time, The (2007), piano and percussion
 Auxetos, 1998, string quartet
 Character of Time, The (2003), solo piano
 Choruses for Virgins Widows and Innocents (2000) flute, clarinet, viola and piano
 Comme Le son Evolue (2002) string orchestra and 2 harps
 Epeisodos (1998), solo Eb clarinet
 Etudes (1994), violin and piano
 Event Horizon (2010), 3 percussionists and piano
 Gu Ta (1998), 3 percussionists
 Lingua e Realidade (2008), piano, cello, violin
 Molto Intimo  (2016), clarinet, trumpet, trombone
 Music fur witwen, jungfrauen und unschuldige (2005), harp, flute, clarinet, string quartet
 Percussion Concerto (2012), piano, 3 percussionists
 Quatro Stati D'essere Immaginari (1999), solo contra bass
 Silk Dialogue V (2006), flute, clarinet, bassoon, Horn 2 violins, viola, cello, contra bass
 Silk Dialogue VI (2008), flute, clarinet in Eb, string quartet
 String Theory (2003), string orchestra
 Tarantelle (2002), solo cello
 Shadow Aspect (2013), solo piano
 String Quartet III (2013), string quartet
 Eratosthenes' Sieve (2014), mixed ensemble
 Jungs Shadow (2012),  cello and piano

Recordings

 The Wai-te-ata Music Press Collection of New Zealand Music No.7 (2004)
 Musical Kaleidoscope: Taiwans Contemporary Music 4 (2008)
 Sunrise: Music for Young Pianists (2007)
 Take Flight: Music for Young Pianists (2011)

References

External links
Composers website
SOUNZ Page
Sound and Music Page

1969 births
Living people
New Zealand composers
Male composers
Victoria University of Wellington alumni